is a former Japanese professional basketball player. He played for the Aisin Seahorses of the JBL Super League. 
Amino also was a member of the Japan national basketball team.  He played for the team in the 2006 FIBA World Championship and the FIBA Asia Championship 2007 and FIBA Asia Championship 2009.

Amino played professionally with the Aisin Seahorses of the JBL Super League.  In the current 2009-10 season, Amino entered the month-long winter break averaging 4.5 points per game for the Seahorses.  Despite this, the popular Amino was voted by fans as a starter to the West squad for the 2009-10 JBL Super League All-Star game.

References

Japanese men's basketball players
1980 births
Living people
Basketball players at the 2006 Asian Games
Basketball players at the 2010 Asian Games
Nihon University Red Sharks men's basketball players
SeaHorses Mikawa players
Shooting guards
Small forwards
2006 FIBA World Championship players
Asian Games competitors for Japan
21st-century Japanese people